This is a list of higher education (Educación Superior) institutions in Paraguay, sorted by date of establishment.

Universities

Public

Private

 See also

 List of schools in Paraguay
 List of universities and colleges by country

External links

 "Education Paraguay"

Universities and colleges
Paraguay
Paraguay